Janes Island State Park is a public recreation area on Chesapeake Bay lying adjacent to the city of Crisfield in Somerset County, Maryland. The park is managed by the Maryland Department of Natural Resources.

History
Janes Island State Park was created in 1963. Between 1965 and 1978, the Maryland General Assembly authorized funding of $1,000,000 for land acquisition and site improvements including beach erosion control measures and construction of camping and picnicking facilities.

Activities and amenities
The park features a conference center, campground, rental cabins, fishing and crabbing, boat launch, boat slips, and canoe and kayak rentals. Canoe trails lead to a 7-mile-long white sandy beach on Tangier Sound and Chesapeake Bay.

References

External links

Janes Island State Park Maryland Department of Natural Resources

State parks of Maryland
Crisfield, Maryland
Parks in Somerset County, Maryland
Protected areas established in 1963
IUCN Category III
1963 establishments in Maryland